Anne de Vries (22 May 1904 – 29 November 1964) was a Dutch teacher and writer, particularly famous in the Netherlands for his novels of regional life. 

Born in the village of Kloosterveen near Assen, de Vries married Alida Gerdina van Wermeskerken in 1930 and the couple had five children. In 1972, de Vries gained national recognition when his novel Bartje was made into a television series by Willy van Hemert. The personnage of Bartje subsequently came to symbolize the Dutch province of Drenthe.

De Vries wrote a number of regional novels, most famously the coming-of-age novel Bartje and then Bartje Seeks Happiness. He also wrote Journey through the Night, a children's book about World War II which was published in four volumes between 1951 and 1958. His Bartje books may be considered Bildungsromane.

De Vries died, aged 60, in Zeist.

Selected works
 Jongens van de straat, 1934
 Bartje, 1935
 De stroper, 1935
 Jaap en Gerdientje, 1937
 Op de grote heide, 1937
 De grote veenbrand, 1937
 Groot vertelboek voor de Bijbelse geschiedenis, 1938
 Verhalen voor Kersttijd, 1948
 Honderd vertellingen uit de bijbel, 1949
 Het boek van Jan Willem, 1950
 Reis door de nacht, 1951–1958
 De ring van de profeet (Anne de Vries and Jan Fabricius), 1952
 Kinderkleurbijbel (Oude testament), 1961
 Twee meisjes in de tropen 1964

References

1904 births
1964 deaths
Dutch writers
People from Assen